Galectin-7 is a protein that in humans is encoded by the LGALS7 gene.

The galectins are a family of beta-galactoside-binding proteins implicated in modulating cell–cell and cell–matrix interactions. Differential and in situ hybridizations indicate that this lectin is specifically expressed in keratinocytes. It is expressed at all stages of epidermal differentiation (i.e., in basal and suprabasal layers). It is moderately repressed by retinoic acid. The protein was found mainly in stratified squamous epithelium. The antigen localized to basal keratinocytes, although it was also found, albeit at lower levels, in the suprabasal layers where it concentrated to areas of cell-to-cell contact. The cellular localization and its striking down-regulation in cultured keratinocytes imply a role in cell–cell and/or cell–matrix interactions necessary for normal growth control.

References

Further reading